Glenn James Morris (born 20 December 1983) is an English professional footballer who plays as a goalkeeper for  club Gillingham.

Early life
Morris was born in Woolwich, Greater London.

Club career

Leyton Orient
He was in and out of the first team at Leyton Orient since making his debut against Dagenham & Redbridge in 2001. In the 2006–07 season, Morris become an understudy to first choice goalkeeper Glyn Garner. However, late in the 2007–08 season he broke into the first team and made his 100th appearance (including cup matches) for the club. Morris has played in a Youth Alliance Cup Final at the Millennium Stadium in Cardiff, he kept a clean sheet as Orient beat Bradford City. Morris was voted young player of the year at Orient in 2003 and 2004.

Morris was released on 9 May 2010 by Orient manager Russell Slade.

Southend United
On 5 August 2010, Morris signed a one-year deal with Southend United. Morris was given the number 1 jersey and established himself as Southend's first choice ahead of fellow new signing Rhys Evans. After 37 appearances in all competitions, Morris was rewarded for his performance with a further one-year contract.

On 18 May 2012, Morris was one of eleven players to be released at the end of their contract.

Aldershot Town
On 1 August 2012, Morris played for Portsmouth in a friendly at Aldershot Town. He then signed for Aldershot on a six-month deal. This was then extended to the end of the season. After making 6 appearances during the 2012–13 season, Morris signed a one-year contract extension.

Gillingham
In 2014, he signed for Gillingham on a one-year deal. He signed a one-year extension at the end of the 2014–15 season, but was released at the end of his contract.

Crawley Town
After leaving Gillingham, he joined Crawley Town in May 2016 as a player-coach, on a one-year contract. On 17 September 2016, Morris made his Crawley Town debut in a 2–0 victory over Luton Town. On 10 March 2017, after displacing Yusuf Mersin and Chelsea loanee Mitchell Beeney, Morris signed a new two-year deal with Crawley running until June 2019. He won the Player of the Year award for Crawley Town for the 2016–17 season.

During the 2017–18 season, Morris made 44 league appearances for the club, and won Crawley's Player of the Year award for the second time. before signing a contract extension in January 2018 until the summer of 2020.

He appeared in all 46 of Crawley's league games during 2018–19. At the end of the 2018–19 season, Morris received a trio of awards for his performances that season, again receiving the Player of the Year award, alongside the Players' Player accolade and the award for the best away player. In September 2019 he signed a new contract until 2021. At the conclusion of the 2020–21 season the club triggered a one-year extension to his contract.

In 2021–22 he was named as the side's Player of the Season for a fourth time.

Gillingham
On 29 July 2022, the eve of the new season, Morris returned to Gillingham on loan until January 2023.  Shortly after his loan spell came to an end, he agreed to terminate his contract with Crawley and join Gillingham on a permanent basis.

Career statistics

Honours 
Individual

 Crawley Town Player of the Season: 2016–17, 2017–18, 2018–19, 2021–22

References

External links
Profile at the Crawley Town F.C. website

 

1983 births
Living people
Footballers from Woolwich
English footballers
Association football goalkeepers
Leyton Orient F.C. players
Southend United F.C. players
Aldershot Town F.C. players
Gillingham F.C. players
Crawley Town F.C. players
English Football League players
National League (English football) players